Euglandina singleyana, the striate glandina or striate wolfsnail, is a species of predatory air-breathing land snail, a terrestrial pulmonate gastropod mollusk in the family Spiraxidae.

Description
This snail has a golden-tan coloration, specially adapted mouthparts, and sensitive chemical receptors. It hunts and feeds in the same fashion as its larger congener, the rosy wolf snail, Euglandina rosea.

Euglandina singleyana is typically found in West Texas.  It prefers areas of prairie and forest, under substrate of dead wood.

References 

Spiraxidae
Gastropods described in 1892